Giannina Russ was born on 27 March, 1873 in Lodi. She was an Italian operatic dramatic soprano, particularly associated with the Italian repertory. She died on 28 February, 1951 in Milan.

Life and career

Russ studied piano and voice at the Milan Music Conservatory with Leoni. She made her debut in Bologna, as Mimi in 1903, at La Scala in 1905, as Aida, and in Florence in 1908, as Norma.

She was quickly invited abroad, making debut in 1904 at both the Royal Opera House in London, and the Monte Carlo Opera, also appearing at the Teatro Colón in Buenos Aires, and the Manhattan Opera Company in New York, in 1907.

Russ performed in a wide range of roles, from bel canto to verismo,  her repertory included; Semiramide, Giulia, Amaltea, Paolina, Abigail, Elvira, Leonora, Amelia, Wally, Gioconda, Santuzza, etc.

She possessed a beautiful and grand voice, if somewhat uneven, and a strong dramatic temperament. She enjoyed more success in Latin countries than in Anglo-Saxon countries. After retirement, she became a respected voice teacher. Amongst her pupils were Margherita Grandi and Clara Petrella.

References

Sources

Le guide de l'opéra, les indispensables de la musique, R. Mancini & J-J. Rouvereux, (Fayard, 1986), 

Italian operatic sopranos
1873 births
1951 deaths
People from Lodi, Lombardy
Fonotipia Records artists